Portland Thorns FC is an American soccer club which began play in the National Women's Soccer League in its inaugural season in 2013.

All rostered players during the NWSL season, including the playoffs, Challenge Cup, and Fall Series, are included, even if they did not make an appearance. Amateur call-ups from 2013 to 2017 are included only if they made an appearance.

All-time roster and appearances 

Statistics are correct , and are updated once a year after the conclusion of the NWSL season. Players whose names are in boldface text were active players on the Thorns roster as of the list's most recent update.

See also 

 List of top-division football clubs in CONCACAF countries
 List of professional sports teams in the United States and Canada

References

External links 
 Portland Thorns FC Roster Details on FBref.com
 Stats on nwslsoccer.com (2016 onward)

Lists of soccer players by club in the United States
 
Oregon sports-related lists
Lists of women's association football players
Lists of American sportswomen
National Women's Soccer League lists
Association football player non-biographical articles